A triskelion or triskeles is an ancient motif consisting of a triple spiral exhibiting   rotational symmetry or other patterns in triplicate that emanate from a common center.
The spiral design can be based on interlocking Archimedean spirals,  or represent three bent human legs. It is found in artefacts of the European Neolithic and Bronze Age with continuation into the Iron Age especially in the context of the La Tène culture and related Celtic traditions.
The actual triskeles symbol of three human legs is found especially in Greek antiquity, beginning in archaic pottery and continued in coinage of the classical period.

In the Hellenistic period, the symbol becomes associated with the island of Sicily, appearing on coins minted under Dionysius I of Syracuse beginning in  BCE.
It later appears in heraldry, and, other than in the flag of Sicily, came to be used in the flag of the Isle of Man (known as ny tree cassyn "the three legs").

Greek  (triskelḗs) means "three-legged".
While the Greek adjective   "three-legged [e.g. of a table]" is ancient, use of the term for the symbol is modern, introduced in 1835 by Honoré Théodoric d'Albert de Luynes as French , and adopted in the spelling triskeles following Otto Olshausen (1886).
The form triskelion (as it were Greek  ) is a diminutive which entered English usage in numismatics in the late 19th century.
The form consisting of three human legs (as opposed to the triple spiral) has also been called a  "triquetra of legs", also triskelos or triskel.

Use in European antiquity

Neolithic to Bronze Age

The triple spiral symbol, or three spiral volute, appears in many early cultures, the first in Malta (4400–3600 BCE) and in the astronomical calendar at the famous megalithic tomb of Newgrange in Ireland built around 3200 BCE, as well as on Mycenaean vessels. The Neolithic era symbol of three conjoined spirals may have had triple significance similar to the imagery that lies behind the triskelion. It is carved into the rock of a stone lozenge near the main entrance of the prehistoric Newgrange monument in County Meath, Ireland. Newgrange, which was built around 3200 BCE.

There is also an example of a Triskele on a stone fragment that was discovered in Gloucestershire, currently held by the British museum thought to date from the period from the Neolithic period up to Bronze age.

Classical Antiquity

The triskeles proper, composed of three human legs, is younger than the triple spiral, found in decorations on Greek pottery
especially as a design shown on hoplite shields, and later also minted on Greek and Anatolian coinage.
An early example is found on the shield of Achilles in an Attic hydria of the late 6th century BCE.
It is found on coinage in Lycia, and on staters of Pamphylia (at Aspendos, 370–333 BCE) and Pisidia. The meaning of the Greek triskeles is not recorded directly.
The Duc de Luynes in his 1835 study noted the co-occurrence of the symbol with the eagle, the cockerel, the head of Medusa, Perseus, three crescent moons, three ears of corn, and three grains of corn.
From this, he reconstructed feminine divine triad which he identified with the "triple goddess" Hecate.

The triskeles was adopted as emblem by the rulers of Syracuse. It is possible that this usage is related with the Greek name of the island of Sicily,  Trinacria (Τρινακρία "having three headlands").
The Sicilian triskeles is shown with the head of Medusa at the center.
The ancient symbol has been re-introduced in modern flags of Sicily since 1848. The oldest find of a triskeles in Sicily is a vase dated to 700 BCE, for which researchers assume a Minoan-Mycenaean origin.

Roman period and Late Antiquity
Late examples of the triple spiral symbols are found in Iron Age Europe, e.g. carved in rock in Castro Culture settlement in Galicia, Asturias and Northern Portugal.
In Ireland before the 5th century, in Celtic Christianity the symbol took on new meaning, as a symbol of the Trinity (Father, Son, and Holy Spirit).

Medieval use
The triple spiral design is found as a decorative element in Gothic architecture. The three legs (triskeles) symbol is rarely found as a charge in late medieval heraldry, notably as the arms of the King of Mann (Armorial Wijnbergen), and as canting arms in the city seal of the Bavarian city of Füssen (dated 1317).

Modern usage
The triskeles was included in the design of the Army Gold Medal awarded to British Army majors and above who had taken a key part in the Battle of Maida (1806).
An early flag of Sicily, proposed in 1848, included the Sicilian triskeles or "Trinacria symbol".
Later versions of Sicilian flags have retained the emblem, including the one officially adopted in 2000.
The Flag of the Isle of Man (1932) shows a heraldic design of a triskeles of three armoured legs.

The spiral is used by some polytheistic reconstructionist or neopagan groups. As a "Celtic symbol", it is used primarily by groups with a Celtic cultural orientation and, less frequently, can also be found in use by various eclectic or syncretic traditions such as Neopaganism. The spiral triskele is one of the primary symbols of Celtic Reconstructionist Paganism, used to represent a variety of triplicities in cosmology and theology; it is also a favored symbol due to its association with the god Manannán mac Lir.
	
Other uses of triskelion-like emblems include the logo for the Trisquel Linux distribution and the seal of the United States Department of Transportation. Afrikaner Weerstandsbeweging,  an Afrikaner nationalist, neo-Nazi organization and political party (founded 1973), uses a triskele composed of three sevens as its symbol.

Occurrence in nature
The boric acid molecule is triskelion-shaped as seen in the image. The molecular point group of triskelion-shaped molecules is C3h. The endocytic protein, clathrin, is triskelion-shaped, as well as the edicaran Tribrachidium.

Gallery

Antiquity

Medieval

Modern

References

External links

Iconography
Ornaments
Rotational symmetry
Symbols
Symmetry
Heraldic charges
Visual motifs
Early Germanic symbols